The Train Goes East is a 1947 Soviet comedy film directed by Yuli Raizman.

Plot 
On Victory Day, on the Moscow-Vladivostok train, Captain Lavrentiev meets with agronomist Zinaida Sokolova. At first they do not like each other, but at one of the stations they get to know each other better against a background of various amusing situations.

Starring 
 Lidiya Dranovskaya as Sokolova
 Leonid Gallis as Lavrentev
 Mariya Yarotskaya as Zakharova   
  as Berezin  
 Konstantin Sorokin as Train superintendent  
 Vladimir Lyubimov as Factory manager  
 Vladimir Lepko as Announcer at the station  
 Andrei Petrov as Goncharenko  
 Alexander Khvylya as Matvey Ivanovich
 Vladimir Dorofeyev as Uncle Egor  
 Mariya Andrianova as Praskovya Stepanovna  
 Valentina Telegina as Pasha
 Vladimir Belokurov as officer

References

External links 
 

1947 films
Soviet romantic comedy films
1940s Russian-language films
Mosfilm films
1947 romantic comedy films
Films scored by Tikhon Khrennikov